South Maitland is a community in the Canadian province of Nova Scotia, located in the Municipal District of East Hants, Hants County, Nova Scotia. The community was one of the stops on the Shubenacadie Canal system and the site of a number of 19th century shipyards including the yard that built the barque Calburga in 1890, the last large square rigger to sail under a Canadian flag. The village is best known for the historic bridge built over the Shubenacadie River, a large bridge built over challenging tidal waters by the Midland Railway, part of the Dominion Atlantic Railway in 1901. Demolished in the 1990s, a surviving abutment of the railway bridge was retrofitted in 2006 by the Fundy Tidal Interpretive Centre at South Maitland as an interpretive lookoff and walking trail showcasing the massive tides of the Shubenacadie River. A former railway caboose is also preserved beside the interpretive tail.

References

Nova Scotia Railway Heritage
Fundy Tidal Interpretive Centre
South Maitland on Destination Nova Scotia

Communities in Hants County, Nova Scotia
General Service Areas in Nova Scotia